Ágústsson is an Icelandic patronymic surname, literally meaning "son of Ágúst". Notable people with the name include:

Baldur Ágústsson, Icelandic businessman
Bergur Elías Ágústsson (born 1963), Icelandic politician 
Bogi Ágústsson (born 1952), Icelandic television journalist
Einar Ágústsson (1922–1986), Icelandic politician
Guðni Ágústsson (born 1949), Icelandic politician
Herbert H. Ágústsson (1926–2017), Icelandic composer and hornist

Icelandic-language surnames